Beyond Desire is a 1995 American action thriller film directed by Dominique Othenin-Girard, written by Dale Trevillion, and starring William Forsythe and Kari Wuhrer. It was released direct-to-video, first in Germany on July 13, 1995, followed by the United States on April 23, 1996. It was released in the United Kingdom as The Last American Elvis.

Plot
Ray "Elvis" Patterson, an ex-con, joins forces with a sexy, high-priced call girl named Rita to help clear his name from a murder charge 14 years earlier while a brutal gangster is after him for the location of some stolen money. Ray served 14 years at Nevada State Prison, after being wrongfully convicted of the murder of his girlfriend.

Now released, Ray sets out to find the true murderer and bring him to justice. Ray and Rita head into Las Vegas together, where Ray believes he will find the answers as to who the killer is. But all is not as it seems as Frank, Rita's boss, turns out to be the man Ray seeks.

Non-stop action and adventure ensue as bullets fly and Ray and Frank go head to head for justice, Rita's heart, and the money that turned up missing from the crime scene 14 years ago.

Cast
 William Forsythe as Ray Patterson
 Kari Wuhrer as Rita
 Leo Rossi as Frank Zulla
 Sharon Farrell as Shirley

Production
Production took place in Las Vegas. Minor filming locations included the La Concha Motel, the Vacation Village hotel and casino, and the Riviera hotel and casino. Scenes were also filmed at Hoover Dam's power plant.

References

External links

1995 films
1995 action thriller films
1995 direct-to-video films
1990s American films
1990s English-language films
American action thriller films
Direct-to-video action films
Direct-to-video thriller films
Films directed by Dominique Othenin-Girard
Films set in the Las Vegas Valley
Films shot in the Las Vegas Valley